Deborah Bryant (born September 21, 1963), better known as Momma Dee, is an actress, singer and reality television personality, best known for her appearances in the VH1 hit reality show Love & Hip Hop: Atlanta.

Early life
Dee was born in 1963 in Brooklyn, New York and attended South Shore High School and Canarsie High School. She graduated with an associate degree in nursing at Georgia State University. In 1996, Dee was involved in a car accident that left her in a wheelchair for three years. Unable to work a traditional job due to her disability, Dee became a pimp and drug dealer to provide for her family. She ran a brothel for ten years under the name "Lady Dee".

Career
Since 2012, Dee has appeared with her son as a supporting cast member on Love & Hip Hop: Atlanta.  During the show, she embarked on a music career, releasing the singles "I Deserve" and "In That Order".

In 2016, she embarked on an acting career, appearing as a pimp in the independent film The Products of the American Ghetto, as well as the mother of the title character in  About Justin, a spin-off of the LGBT web series About Him.

Personal life
Dee first married Ernest Bryant in 1996 but divorced in 2014. The two reunited and remarried in 2015, and their wedding was documented in the fourth-season finale of Love & Hip Hop: Atlanta. The couple was later featured on the court television program Couples Court with the Cutlers over concerns of infidelity on her part; though the two reconciled at the end of the episode.

She has two children, Jasmine Brown and Darryl Richardson Jr., better known as the rapper Lil Scrappy. Her cousin is the rapper Yung Joc, who produced and is featured on her single, "In That Order".

Discography

Singles

Filmography

Films

Television

References

External links
 
 

Living people
21st-century American actresses
21st-century American musicians
Actresses from Atlanta
American hip hop musicians
Musicians from Atlanta
Participants in American reality television series
1963 births
American women hip hop musicians